The Masonic Temple, also known as St. John's Lodge No. 3, A.F. & A.M., is a historic Masonic temple and theatre located at 516 Hancock Street in New Bern, Craven County, North Carolina. It was built between 1802 and 1809, with additions and several alterations.  The original section is a very tall, two-story Federal style brick structure, seven bays wide by four bays deep.  It sits on a high basement and has a hipped roof.  A major addition was made in 1904, and the building was remodeled in 1847 and in 1917. The site was the scene of a duel in 1802.

It was listed on the National Register of Historic Places in 1972.

References

External links

 

Historic American Buildings Survey in North Carolina
Clubhouses on the National Register of Historic Places in North Carolina
Federal architecture in North Carolina
Buildings and structures completed in 1809
Buildings and structures in New Bern, North Carolina
Masonic buildings in North Carolina
National Register of Historic Places in Craven County, North Carolina